The 1953 Suva earthquake occurred on 14 September at 00:26 UTC near Suva, Fiji, just off the southeast shore of Viti Levu. This earthquake had an estimated magnitude of  6.8 and  6.4. The earthquake triggered a coral reef platform collapse and a submarine landslide that caused a tsunami. Eight people were reported killed; a wharf, bridges, and buildings were severely damaged in Suva.

Tectonic setting 
Fiji lies in a complex tectonic setting along the boundary between the Australian Plate and the Pacific Plate. Southwards from Fiji the Pacific Plate is subducting beneath the Australian Plate along the Tonga Trench forming the Tonga Ridge island arc system and the Lau Basin back-arc basin. To the southwest of Fiji the Australian Plate is subducting beneath the Pacific Plate forming the Vanuatu Ridge island arc system and the North Fiji back-arc basin. Hence, the region has undergone a complex process of plate convergence, subduction, and arc volcanism from the Middle Eocene to the Early Pliocene. Many of the larger islands, such as Viti Levu, are of volcanic origin. Volcanism still exists, and there are Holocene volcanos in Fiji.

The Fiji Platform lies in a zone bordered with active extension fault lines around which most of the shallow earthquakes were centered. These fault lines are the Fiji Fracture Zone (FFZ) to the north, the 176° Extension Zone (176°E EZ) to the west, and the Hunter Fracture Zone (HFZ) to the east.

Earthquake 
The earthquake lasted between 25 and 30 seconds and had an estimated magnitude of 6.75 on the surface wave magnitude scale. The calculated focal mechanism is consistent with slightly oblique dextral (right lateral) strike-slip on a NW-SE trending fault plane, matching the orientation of other fault planes measured in the area and a marked bathymetric lineament. The fault parameters calculated for the earthquake are a length of 30 km, a width of 27 km and a slip of one metre. The NW trending nodal plane of this earthquake coincides with the strike of the NW trending Naqara Fault on the southeast coast of Viti Levu.

Tsunami 
The first sign of the tsunami was observed about one minute after the earthquake when a disturbance of the sea surface was noticed by the captain of the cutter Adi Tirisa "beyond the reef some 4 to 5 miles southwest of Suva…she was badly shaken and a little later three great spouts burst out of the sea, carrying mud, stones, and part of a long-wrecked vessel…" The location of this disturbance was at the western end of the entrance to the Suva Passage.

Origin 
From the type of fault displacement and the magnitude of the event it was clear that the tsunami was not caused by any displacement of the seabed associated with the earthquake. The shaking triggered collapse of part of the barrier reef at Suva into the Suva Canyon. The current reef edge shows the effects of repeated slope failure. The characteristics of the 1953 landslide scar were investigated using a high resolution multibeam echo sounder. The area immediately offshore from the reef is a composite failure surface, within which a fresh scar was identified with a width of 800 m, defining an estimated slide volume of 60 million cubic metres. Numerical modelling of this as the likely source was able to reproduce many aspects of the observed development of the tsunami.

Damage 
This earthquake was the most destructive in Fiji's recorded history, the tremor itself killing three people and seriously injuring twenty others. The most serious damage occurred in the southeastern part of Viti Levu. The tsunami caused particular damage to coastal areas not protected by barrier reefs, devastating the villages of Nakasaleka and Makaluva. There were five deaths from the tsunami, three at Suva and two at Nakasaleka. Had the tsunami occurred at high tide, rather than low tide it would have been more damaging.

The landslide that caused the tsunami generated turbidity currents that damaged several underwater cables in the Suva Canyon. The total damage caused by earthquake and tsunami was estimated as $500,000 (at 1953 values in U.S. dollars).

See also 
List of earthquakes in 1953
List of earthquakes in Fiji

References

Further reading

External links 

1953 earthquakes
Earthquakes in Fiji
1953 in Fiji
1953 tsunamis
Tsunamis in Fiji
1953 disasters in Fiji